is a Japanese surname. Notable people with the surname include:

, male Japanese animation director
, Japanese male voice actor
, Kamakura-bori artist from Japan
, Japanese football player
, Japanese aikido teacher holding the rank of 8th dan in the Aikikai
, samurai commander in Japan's Sengoku period
, samurai commander of the Suganuma clan during Japan's Sengoku period

Japanese-language surnames